Wild Stab' is the 2016 debut from American rock music duo The I Don't Cares, made up of alternative rock singer-songwriters Juliana Hatfield and Paul Westerberg. The album contains a mix of songs: original material written by the duo, "never-before-heard gems from Westerberg’s basement archive, and re-recorded solo tunes from his back catalog." It has received positive reviews from critics.

Critical reception
The editorial staff of AllMusic Guide gave the album four out of five stars, with review Stephen Thomas Erlewine praised the musicians' opportunity to have fun with the recording, summing up his review, "All the mess, from its demo-quality fidelity to its throwaways, is intentional and the album is better for it: it's two old pros having a good time, so it's hard not to have a good time too". In an overview of Westerberg's career for Spin in 2016, Drew Fortune calls the collaboration a natural fit and characterizes the album as "just as loose and ramshackle as the band’s name implies".

Track listing
"Back"– 3:52
"Wear Me Out Loud"– 2:41
"Born for Me"– 4:08
"1 / 2 2 P" (Westerberg)– 2:44
"Sorry for Tomorrow Night"– 2:41
"Dance to the Fight" (Hatfield and Westerberg)– 2:16
"Kissing Break" (Hatfield and Westerberg)– 3:18
"Just a Phase" (Hatfield and Westerberg)– 3:25
"Outta My System"– 3:40
"Need the Guys"– 2:27
"Love Out Loud"– 2:14
"King of America" (Westerberg)– 3:29
"Little People"– 1:42
"Whole Lotta Nothin'" (Hatfield and Westerberg)– 3:51
"Done Done Done"– 2:18
"Hands Together"– 6:51

Personnel
The I Don't Cares
Juliana Hatfield– guitar, vocals
Paul Westerberg– guitar, vocals

Additional personnel
Josh Freese– drums

References

External links

Info on The I Don't Cares from Westerberg's site

2016 debut albums
The I Don't Cares albums